Sir Francis Throckmorton (155410 July 1584) was a conspirator against Queen Elizabeth I of England in the Throckmorton Plot.

Life

He was the son of Sir John Throckmorton, who was the seventh out of eight sons of Sir George Throckmorton of Coughton Court. He was a nephew of Sir Nicholas Throckmorton, one of Elizabeth's diplomats, who had held the post of Chief Justice of Chester but was removed in 1579, a year before his death. His paternal grandmother, Hon. Katherine Vaux, daughter of Nicholas Vaux, 1st Baron Vaux of Harrowden, was the paternal aunt of the Protestant queen consort of King Henry VIII, Catherine Parr.

Francis Throckmorton was educated from 1572 at Hart Hall, Oxford and entered the Inner Temple in London as a pupil in 1576. In Oxford he had come under the influence of Catholics, and when Edmund Campion and Robert Persons came to England in 1580 to conduct Jesuit propaganda, Francis was one of the members of the Temple who helped them.

In 1580, Throckmorton travelled to the European continent and met leading Catholic malcontents from England abroad (in Spain and France). 
It was in Paris that he met Charles Paget and Thomas Morgan, agents of Mary, Queen of Scots. 
Following his return to England in 1583, he served as an intermediary for communications between supporters of the Catholic cause on the continent, the imprisoned Mary, Queen of Scots, and the Spanish ambassador Bernardino de Mendoza. The plot intended an invasion of England by a French force under command of the Duke of Guise, or by Spanish and Italian forces sent by Philip II of Spain for the purpose of releasing the imprisoned Mary Queen of Scots and restoring the Catholic Church in England and Wales. Throckmorton occupied a house, on Paul's Wharf in London, which served as a meeting-place for the conspirators.

Throckmorton carried Mary's letters to the French ambassador Michel de Castelnau, Sieur de Mauvissière and his secretary Claude de Courcelles, who resided at Salisbury Court near Fleet Street. In 2023 coded letters from Mary to Castelnau were discovered in the Bibliothèque nationale de France and deciphered. The letters were probably put into cipher by Mary's secretaries Gilbert Curle, Claude Nau, and Jerome Pasquier. In the ciphered texts Throckmorton was given the codename or alias Monsieur de la Tour.

Throckmorton's activities raised the suspicions of Sir Francis Walsingham, Elizabeth I's spymaster. A search of his house produced incriminating evidence and, after torture upon the rack, Throckmorton confessed his involvement in a plot to overthrow the Queen and restore the Catholic Church in England. An invasion led by Henry I, Duke of Guise, would have been coupled with an orchestrated uprising of Catholics within the country.

Throckmorton later retracted his confession, but other sources of the plot, and a search of his premises, further incriminated him. He was convicted of high treason and executed on 10 July 1584. His arrest led to the end of the conspiracy and the expulsion of the Spanish ambassador.

In September 1586, Mary, Queen of Scot's servant Jérôme Pasquier was questioned in the Tower of London by Thomas Phelippes. He confessed to writing a letter in cipher for Mary to send to the French ambassador Castelnau asking him to negotiate a pardon for Francis Throckmorton in a prisoner exchange.

In film and literature
Sir Francis Throckmorton is featured in the film Elizabeth: The Golden Age, where he is played by Steven Robertson. In the film, he is shown asking for help from his cousin, Elizabeth Throckmorton, one of Queen Elizabeth's ladies-in-waiting and later the wife of Sir Walter Raleigh.

Throckmorton's recruitment to act as a courier to Queen Mary and the way he was discovered by Walsingham's agents are depicted in Ken Follett's historical novel A Column of Fire. As depicted in the book, Throckmorton was a minor member of the conspiracy, the main organiser who recruited him managing to escape undetected.

Notes

References

1554 births
1584 deaths
People executed under the Tudors for treason against England
Executed English people
Francis
Date of birth unknown
Date of death missing
Place of birth missing
Place of death missing
People executed by the Kingdom of England by hanging
People executed under Elizabeth I